Raetia was the name of a canton of the Helvetic Republic from 1798 to 1803, corresponding to modern Graubünden and composed of the Free State of the Three Leagues. Until 1799, the canton was administered by the central government of the Helvetic Republic.

The districts of Chiavenna, Valtellina and Bormio, previously dependencies of the Leagues, were never a part of the canton, having permanently been detached from the Leagues after Revolutionary France fomented revolt there, leading them to be annexed to the Cisalpine Republic on October 10, 1797. The districts subsequently joined the Austrian client kingdom of Lombardy–Venetia after the Congress of Vienna and eventually become the Italian province of Sondrio. The town of Campione, an imperial fief into the Landvogtei of Lugano at the same time, joined Lombardy leading to its current position as an Italian enclave within Ticino.

With the Napoleonic Act of Mediation in 1803, the canton was reestablished as Graubünden, finally incorporating the Three Leagues into a decentralized and federal Switzerland.

Notes and references

External links 
 

Cantons of the Helvetic Republic
Former cantons of Switzerland